Chengdu (simplified Chinese: 成都; pinyin: Chéngdū; Sichuanese pronunciation: ,), alternatively romanized as Chengtu, is a sub-provincial city which serves as the capital of the Chinese province of Sichuan. With a population of 20,937,757 inhabitants during the 2020 Chinese census, it is the fourth most populous city in China, and it is the only city apart from the four direct-administered municipalities with a population of over 20 million. It is traditionally the hub in Southwest China. 

Chengdu is located in central Sichuan. The surrounding Chengdu Plain is known as the "Country of Heaven" and the "Land of Abundance". Its prehistoric settlers included the Sanxingdui culture. The site of Dujiangyan, an ancient irrigation system, is designated as a World Heritage Site. The Jin River flows through the city. Chengdu's culture largely reflects that of its province, Sichuan; in 2011, it was recognized by UNESCO as a city of gastronomy. It is associated with the giant panda, a Chinese national symbol, which inhabits the area of Sichuan; the city is home to the Chengdu Research Base of Giant Panda Breeding.

Founded by the state of Shu, Chengdu is unique as a major Chinese settlement that has maintained its name mostly unchanged throughout the imperial, republican, and communist eras. It was the capital of Liu Bei's Shu Han during the Three Kingdoms Era, as well as several other local kingdoms during the Middle Ages. During World War II, refugees from eastern China fleeing from the Japanese settled in Chengdu. After the war, Chengdu was briefly the capital of the Nationalist republican government until it withdrew to Taipei on the island of Taiwan. Under the PRC, Chengdu's importance as a link between Eastern and Western China expanded, with railways built to Chongqing in 1952, and Kunming and Tibet afterward. In the 1960s, Chengdu became an important defense industry hub.

Chengdu is now one of the most important economic, financial, commercial, cultural, transportation, and communication centers in China. Its economy is diverse, characterized by the machinery, automobile, medicine, food, and information technology industries. Chengdu Shuangliu International Airport, and the newly built Tianfu International Airport, a hub of Air China and Sichuan Airlines, is one of the 30 busiest airports in the world, and the Chengdu railway station is one of the six biggest in China. Chengdu is considered a "Beta + (global second-tier)" city classification (together with Barcelona and Washington, D.C.) according to the Globalization and World Cities Research Network. Chengdu is a leading financial hub, ranking 35th globally the 2021 Global Financial Centres Index.  Chengdu also hosts many international companies; more than 300 Fortune 500 companies have established branches in Chengdu. The city also hosts more than 16 foreign consulates, making it the fourth major city to host more foreign representatives than any other city in China after Beijing, Shanghai, and Guangzhou. Chengdu is the seat of the Western Theater Command region of the People's Liberation Army. Chengdu hosted the FISU Summer World University Games, an international multi-sport event. It is considered one of the most livable cities in China. 

Chengdu is one of the world's top 30 cities by scientific research output, and home to the greatest number of universities and research institutes in Southwestern China, notably Sichuan University, University of Electronic Science and Technology of China, Southwestern University of Finance and Economics, Southwest Jiaotong University, Chengdu University of Technology, Sichuan Normal University, and Xihua University.

Name
The name Chengdu is attested in sources dating back to the Warring States period. It has been called the only major city in China to have remained at an unchanged location with an unchanged name throughout the imperial, republican, and communist eras, although it also had other names; for example it was briefly known as "Xijing" (Western Capital) in the 17th century. Etymology of the name is unclear. The earliest and most widely known explanation, although not generally accepted by modern scholars, is provided in the 10th-century geographical work Universal Geography of the Taiping Era, which states that the ninth king of Shu's Kaiming dynasty named his new capital Chengdu after a statement by King Tai of Zhou that a settlement needed "one year to become a town, two to become a city, and three to become a metropolis". (The character for cheng  may mean "turned into" while du  can mean either a metropolis or a capital.)

The present spelling is based on pinyin romanization; its Postal Map romanization was "Chengtu". Its former status as the seat of the Chengdu Prefecture prompted Marco Polo's spellings "Sindafu", "Sin-din-fu", &c. and the Protestant missionaries' romanization "Ching-too Foo".

Although the official name of the city has remained (almost) constant, the surrounding area has sometimes taken other names, including "Yizhou".

Logo
The city logo adopted in 2011 is inspired by the Golden Sun Bird, an ancient relic unearthed in 2001 from the Jinsha Site.

History

Early history
Archaeological discoveries at the Sanxingdui and Jinsha Site have established that the area surrounding Chengdu was inhabited over four thousand years ago, in 18–10th centuryBC. At the time of China's Xia, Shang, and Zhou dynasties, it represented a separate ancient bronze-wielding culture which—following its partial sinification—became known to the Chinese as Shu. Shu was conquered by Qin in 316BC and the settlement re-founded by the Qin general Zhang Yi. (A Chinese legend explains the town's nickname "Turtle City" by claiming Zhang planned the course of his city walls by following a turtle's tracks.) Although he had argued against the invasion, the settlement thrived and the additional resources from Sichuan helped enable the First Emperor of Qin to unify the Warring States which had succeeded the Zhou.

Pre-Qin to Qin and Han dynasties 
In the early stage of the Xia dynasty or even earlier, the ancient Shu Kingdom located on the Chengdu Plain has formed a relatively developed bronze civilization, becoming an important source of Chinese civilization and one of the birthplaces of the Chinese nation. According to records, there were five dynasties in the ancient Shu Kingdom, and their capitals were Qushang (now Wenjiang District, Chengdu), Piyi (now Pidu District), Xindu, and Guangdu. At the end of the Spring and Autumn Period (around the 4th century BC), the fifth King Kaiming moved the capital to Chengdu. According to "Taiping Huanyu Ji", the name of the city is borrowed from the history of the establishment of the capital in the Western Zhou dynasty. The allusions of Zhou Wang Qianqi's "one year, he lived in a cluster, two years became a city, and three years Chengdu", because of the name Chengdu, it has been used to this day. Therefore, Chengdu has become a rare city in China and the world that has not changed its name since its establishment. Some people think that Chengdu is a transliteration of ancient Shu place names. There is a saying that "Guangdu, Xindu and Chengdu" are collectively referred to as the "Three Capitals of Ancient Shu". Nowadays, there are many cultural relics of ancient Shu Kingdom in Chengdu Plain, such as Sanxingdui Ruins, Jinsha Ruins, Yufu Ancient City Ruins, Wangcong Temple, etc. Jinsha Ruins located in the urban area of ​​Chengdu is a peak of the development of ancient Shu culture.

The Golden Mask of the Shang and Zhou dynasties at the Jinsha Site.

The ancient state of Shu was the first target to be conquered by the Qin state in the process of unifying the world. King Huiwen of Qin had prepared for this for many years, and opened up the Shiniu Road (that is, the Jinniu Road) from Qin to Shu. In 316 BC, King Huiwen of Qin took advantage of the mutual attack between Ba and Shu, and sent Sima Cuo to lead his army into Shu along the Shiniu Road, and they captured the land in a few months. After that, the king of Qin established three abolitions of Shu Hou, and finally established Shu County, and the county seat of Chengdu County was established in Chengdu, the former capital of Shu. In 311 BC, Zhang Yi of the Qin dynasty built the Chengdu city wall according to the system of the capital Xianyang, and built a large city and a small city. In 256 BC, King Zhao of Qin appointed Li Bing as the governor of Shu County. During his tenure, he presided over the construction of the world-famous Dujiangyan Water Conservancy Project. The Chengdu Plain has been fertile and wild for thousands of miles since then. After decades of operation, Chengdu replaced Guanzhong Plain in the late Qin dynasty and was called the "Land of Abundance", and this reputation has continued to this day.

During the Han dynasty, the Chengdu economy, especially its brocade industry, prospered, becoming an important source of tribute to the court. The imperial court invested in Chengdu and specially set up Jinguan management and built "Jinguan City" in the southwest of Chengdu, "Jinguan City" and "Jincheng" becoming nicknames for Chengdu. In the second year of Emperor Ping of the Yuan dynasty, the population of Chengdu reached 76,000 households, or about 354,000 people, making it one of the most populous cities at that time. Towards the six major cities. In the third year of the reign of Emperor Jing of the Han dynasty (141 BC), the Wen Dang, the prefect of Shu County, established the world's earliest local government-run school, "Wenweng Shishi," in Chengdu. In the Han dynasty, Chengdu's literature and art also reached a high level. All the most famous literary masters in the Han dynasty were from Chengdu, including Sima Xiangru, Yang Xiong, and Wang Bao.

In the former Han dynasty, the whole country was divided into 14 prefectural governors' departments, among which the Yizhou governor was established in Luoxian (now Guanghan City, Sichuan), and the governor later moved to Chengdu. In the first year of Emperor Guangwu's reign (25 years) in the Eastern Han dynasty, Gongsun Shu established himself as the emperor in Chengdu, and the country's name was "married family". In the twelfth year of Jianwu in the Later Han dynasty (36 years), the Great Sima Wuhan of the Eastern Han dynasty finally captured Chengdu after five years of war, and his family perished. In the fifth year of Zhongping (188), Emperor Ling of Han, the court accepted Liu Yan's suggestion and changed the provincial governors to state shepherds with actual recruitment and command power. In the fifth year of Chuping (194), it moved to Chengdu. At that time, the Yizhou Provincial Governor's Department was the place where the Hu people in the Western Regions were operating.

Imperial era

Under the Han, the brocade produced in Chengdu became fashionable and was exported throughout China. A "Brocade Official" was established to oversee its quality and supply. After the fall of the Eastern Han, Liu Bei ruled Shu, the southwestern of the Three Kingdoms, from Chengdu. His minister Zhuge Liang called the area the "Land of Abundance". Under the Tang, Chengdu was considered the second most prosperous city in China after Yangzhou. Both Li Bai and Du Fu lived in the city. Li Bai praised it as "lying above the empyrean". The city's present Caotang ("Grass Hall") was constructed in 1078 in honor of an earlier, more humble structure of that name erected by Du Fu in 760, the second year of his 4-year stay. The Taoist Qingyang Gong ("Green Goat Temple") was built in the 9th century.

Chengdu was the capital of Wang Jian's Former Shu from 907 to 925, when it was conquered by the Later Tang. The Later Shu was founded by Meng Zhixiang in 934, with its capital at Chengdu. Its King Mengchang beautified the city by ordering hibiscus to be planted upon the city walls.

The Song conquered the city in 965, introducing the first widely used paper money in the world. Su Shi praised it as "the southwestern metropolis". At the fall of the Song, a rebel leader set up a short-lived kingdom known as Great Shu (Dàshǔ). Allegedly the Mongols called for the death of a million people in the city but the city's population had less than 30,000 residents (not Chengdu prefecture). The aged males who had not fled were killed while in typical fashion, the women, children and artisans were enslaved and deported. During the Yuan dynasty, most of Sichuan's residents were deported to Hunan during the insurgency of the western ethnic tribes of western Sichuan. Marco Polo visited Chengdu and wrote about the Anshun Bridge or an earlier version of it.

At the fall of the Ming, the rebel Zhang Xianzhong established his Great Western Kingdom with its capital at Chengdu; it lasted only from 1643 to 1646. Zhang was said to have massacred a large number of people in Chengdu and throughout Sichuan. In any case, Chengdu was said to have become a virtual ghost town frequented by tigers and the depopulation of Sichuan necessitated the resettlement of millions of people from other provinces during the Qing dynasty. Following the Columbian Exchange, the Chengdu Plain became one of China's principal sources of tobacco. Pi County was considered to have the highest quality in Sichuan, which was the center of the country's cigar and cigarette production, the rest of the country long continuing to consume snuff instead.

Modern era

In 1911, Chengdu's branch of the Railway Protection Movement helped trigger the Wuchang Uprising, which led to the Xinhai Revolution that overthrew the Qing dynasty.

During World War II, the capital city of China was forced to move inland from Nanjing to Wuhan in 1937 and from Wuhan to Chengdu, then from Chengdu to Chongqing in 1938, as the Kuomintang (KMT) government under Generalissimo Chiang Kai-shek ultimately retreated to Sichuan to escape from the invading Japanese forces. They brought with them into Sichuan business people, workers, and academics who founded many of the industries and cultural institutions which continue to make Chengdu an important cultural and commercial production center.

Chengdu became a military center for the KMT to regroup in the War of Resistance. Chengdu was beyond the reach of the Imperial Japanese ground forces and escort fighter planes. However, the Japanese frequently flew in the then-highly advanced twin-engine long-ranged G3M "Nell" medium bombers to conduct massive aerial bombardments of both civilian and military targets in Chongqing and Chengdu. The massed formation of the G3M bombers provided heavy firepower against Chinese fighter planes assigned to the defense of Chongqing and Chengdu, which continued to cause problems for the Japanese attacks.

Slow and vulnerable obsolescent Chinese fighter aircraft burning low-grade fuel were still sufficiently dangerous in the hands of capable pilots against the Japanese schnellbomber-terror bombing raiders; on 4 November 1939 for instance, Capt. Cen Zeliu (Wade-Giles: Shen Tse-Liu) led his 17th Fighter Squadron, 5th Fighter Group of seven cannon-equipped Dewoitine D.510 fighters in a level head-on attack against an incoming coming raid of 72 IJANF G3M bombers (Capt. Cen chose this tactic knowing that the operation of the Hispano-Suiza HS.404 20mm autocannon in his D.510 is likely to fail under the g-loads of a high-deflection diving attack), with Capt. Cen pummeling the lead G3M of the IJN's 13th Kōkūtai's CO Captain Kikushi Okuda with cannon fire, sending the G3M crashing down in flames over Chengdu, along with three other G3M bombers destroyed in the Chengdu raid that day. With the death of Captain Okuda in the air battle over Chengdu, the IJN  became the highest-ranking IJN Air officer to be killed-in-action in the War of Resistance/World War II thus far.

In mid-late 1940, unknown to the Americans and European allies, the Imperial Japanese appeared in the skies over Chongqing and Chengdu with the world's most advanced fighter plane at the time: the A6M "Zero" fighter that dominated the skies over China against the increasingly obsolete Russian-made Polikarpov I-15/I-153s and I-16s that were the principal fighter planes of the Chinese Nationalist Air Force. This would later prove to be a rude awakening for the Allied forces in the Pacific War following the attack on Pearl Harbor. One of the first American ace fighter pilots of the war and original volunteer fighter pilot for the Chinese Nationalist Air Force, Major Huang Xinrui (nicknamed "Buffalo" by his comrades) died as a result of battling the Zero fighters along with his squadronmates Cen Zeliu and Lin Heng (younger brother of renowned architect Lin Huiyin) defending Chengdu on 14 March 1941. 

Following the attack on Pearl Harbor at the end of 1941, the United States began setting up stations at airbases in China. In 1944, the American XX Bomber Command launched Operation Matterhorn, an ambitious plan to base B-29 Superfortresses in Chengdu and strategically bomb the Japanese Home Islands. The operating base was located in Xinjin Airport in the southwestern part of the Chengdu metropolitan area. Because the operation required a massive airlift of fuel and supplies over the Himalayas, it was not a significant military success, but it did earn Chengdu the distinction of launching the first serious retaliation against the Japanese homeland.

During the Chinese Civil War, Chengdu was the last city on the Chinese mainland to be held by the Kuomintang. President Chiang Kai-shek and his son Chiang Ching-kuo directed the defense of the city from Chengdu Central Military Academy until 1949, when Communist forces took the city on 27 December. The People's Liberation Army took the city without any resistance after a deal was negotiated between the People's Liberation Army and the commander of the KMT Army guarding the city. On 10 December the remnants of the Nationalist Chinese government evacuated to Taiwan.

The Chengdu Tianfu District Great City is a sustainable planned city that will be outside of Central Chengdu, and is expected to be completely built later in the decade. The city is also planned to be self-sustaining, with every residence being a two-minute walk from a park.

The Great City
In 2019, Chengdu overtook Shenzhen, China's technology hub, as the best-performing Chinese economy. The city has surged in population in the last two decades. Investments into a Europe-Chengdu Express Railway have been made, providing even more opportunity for the city to grow. As a way to preserve farmland and accommodate the growing population of Chengdu, China is building a hyper-dense satellite city centered around a central mass-transit hub called the Great City where any destination within the city is within a 15-minute walk. This proto-type city is intended to provide affordable, high-quality lifestyle, which provides people-oriented spaces that does not require a car to navigate.

Their current urban-planning focus in the city of Chengdu is to make the city 'a city within a park' rather than creating parks within a city. The Great City falls in line with the Chengdu 'park city' initiative, prioritizing the environment, public space and quality of life. It will consist of 15% park and green space and be situated on a  area. Although 25% of the space will be dedicated to roads, one half of the roads will be pedestrian-oriented. This transit system provides direct transport to Chengdu itself. It is expected that the city will consume 48% less energy than cities of similar size.

The goal of the 'park city' project is to allow a city like Chengdu to compete with Beijing and Shanghai without stripping the city of its character. The city of Chengdu is already known for its focus on quality of life, which includes affordable housing, good public schools, trees and bike lanes. However, this project is considered an urban renewal project, and to carry out this project, demolitions and forced evictions are occurring. The Great City may be, in part, compensation for urban renewal project going on in Chengdu. The Great City fulfills the need for affordable housing as Chengdu carries out demolitions.

Geography

Northwest Chengdu is bordered by the high and steep Longmen Mountains in the north-west and in the west by the Qionglai Mountains, the elevation of which exceeds  and includes Miao Jiling and Xiling Snow Mountain. The western mountainous area is also home to a large primitive forest with abundant biological resources and a giant panda habitat. East of Chengdu stands the low Longquan Mountains and the west bordering area of the hilly land of middle reaches of Min River, an area noted by several converging rivers. Since ancient times, Chengdu has been known as "the Abundant Land" owing to its fertile soil, favorable climate, and novel Dujiangyan Irrigation System.

Chengdu is located at the western edge of the Sichuan Basin and sits on the Chengdu Plain; the dominating terrain is plains. Neighboring prefectures are Deyang (NE), Ziyang (SE), Meishan (S), Ya'an (SW), and the Ngawa Tibetan and Qiang Autonomous Prefecture (N).

Climate
Chengdu has a monsoon-influenced humid subtropical climate (Köppen Cwa) and is largely warm with high relative humidity all year. It has four distinct seasons, with moderate rainfall concentrated mainly in the warmer months, and relieved from both sweltering summers and freezing winters. The Qin Mountains (Qinling) to the far north help shield the city from cold Siberian winds in the winter; because of this, the short winter is milder than in the Lower Yangtze. The summer is hot and humid, but not to the extent of the "Three Furnaces" cities of Chongqing, Wuhan, and Nanjing, all of which lie in the Yangtze basin. Rainfall occurs most frequently and is concentrated in July and August, with very little of it in the cooler months. Chengdu also has one of the lowest annual sunshine totals nationally, with less sunshine annually than much of Northern Europe, and most days are overcast even if without rain. This is especially so in the winter months, when it is nearly continuously grey, compounded by the poor air quality. With monthly percent possible sunshine ranging from 16 percent in December to 38 percent in August, the city receives 1,073 hours of bright sunshine annually. Spring (March–April) tends to be sunnier and warmer in the day than autumn (October–November).

Administrative divisions
Chengdu is a sub-provincial city which has served as the capital of Sichuan since Chongqing's restoration to provincial status in 1997. It has direct jurisdiction over 12 districts, 5 county-level cities and 3 counties:

 Tianfu New Area
 Chengdu Economic and Technological Development Zone
 Chengdu Hi-tech Industrial Development Zone
 Chengdu Tianfu Software Park
 Chengdu Export Processing Zone

Cityscape

As of July 2013, the world's largest building in terms of floor area, the New Century Global Center is located in the city.

Ancient fortress wall

Four gates were constructed on all sides of the wall, with hibiscus trees planted outside.

Demographics

According to the 2020 Chinese census, the municipality had 20,937,757 inhabitants; the metropolitan area itself was home to 16,045,577 inhabitants including those of the 12 urban districts plus Guanghan City (in Deyang). Chengdu is the largest city in Sichuan and the sixth largest in China. 21,192,000 for 2021, adding more residents than any other city in the country.

As of 2015, the OECD (Organization for Economic Cooperation and Development) estimated the Chengdu metropolitan area's population to be 18.1 million.

Culture

In 2006, China Daily named Chengdu China's fourth-most-livable city.

Literature
Some of China's most important literature comes from Chengdu. The city has been home to literary giants, such as Sima Xiangru and Yang Xiong, two masters of Fu, a mixture of descriptive prose and verse during the Tang dynasty; Li Bai and Du Fu, the most eminent poets of the Tang and Song dynasties respectively; Yang Shen'an, a famous scholar of the Ming dynasty; and Guo Moruo and Ba Jin, two well-known modern writers. Chang Qu, a historian of Chengdu during the Jin dynasty, compiled the earliest local historical records, the Record of Hua Yang State. Zhao Chongzuo, a poet in Chengdu during the Later Shu Kingdom, edited Among the Flowers, the first anthology of Ci in China's history. Meng Chang, the king of Later Shu, wrote the first couplet for the Spring Festival, which says, "A harvest year accepts celebrations, good festivals foreshadow long springs."

In 2023, Chengdu will host the 81st World Science Fiction Convention, having beat out Winnipeg, Canada, in site-selection voting in 2021.

Fine art
During the period of the Five Dynasties, Huang Quan, a painter in Chengdu, initiated the Fine-Brush Flower-and-Bird Painting school with other painters. At that time, "Hanlin Painting Academy" was the earliest royal academy in China.

Religion

Chengdu contains official, Roman Catholic and Protestant congregations, some of which are underground churches.

15 October 1696: The Roman Catholic Church established as Apostolic Vicariate of Szechwan.

In 1890, the Canadian Methodist Mission was searching for more stations in Asia. During the meeting, it was proposed he lead this contingency; having built western hospitals, Boy's and Girl's schools at Missions he established on the Yangtze and Gan Rivers from 1866 – 1888. On 9 May 1891 Dr. Virgil Hart arrived in Chengtu and two weeks later bought a home and had it subdivided into living quarters and a dispensary, for the later arriving Missionary staff to move into.

On 24 June 1892, the doors of Chengtu's first Protestant Mission Headquarters were opened with over one thousand people of the community attending. The first Methodist religious service was held the following Sunday with only several attendants. The first western dispensary in Sichuan was opened 3 November 1892 with sixteen patients seeking care. The mission site became so popular that a larger space was secured near Chengtu's East Gate in the spring of 1893. This site is where the city's first Methodist church (Sï-Shen-Tsï Methodist Church) and hospital were built. These were later razed by rioting Chinese in 1895 and the Mission staff retreated to Chongqing and later Shanghai to escape the marauders. Dr. Virgil Hart traveled to Peking to demand redress and full payment of retribution was collected from Sichuan Viceroy Liu Ping Chang. The mission compound was quickly rebuilt only to be destroyed once more in the riots of 1901. These were rebuilt a third time and later missionaries would relocate and expand the Boys' and Girls' Schools just south of the city, dedicating the Divinity College as Hart College in 1914; a part of the West China Union University, that is now Sichuan University and the West China School of Medicine (Huaxiyida).

The Sï-Shen-Tsï Methodist Church near the East Gate would be closed by the CCP and became a grain storage facility. It was reopened as a Three-Self Patriotic Protestant church in the mid-1980s.

In December 2018 the authorities attempted to close a 500-member underground church: "The Early Rain Covenant Church", led by Pastor Wang Yi. Over 100 members of the church were arrested including the pastor and his wife. The church's kindergarten and theological college were raided and the church's media outlets were closed down. Before his arrest, church member Li Yingqiang declared: "Even if we are down to our last five, worship and gatherings will still go on because our faith is real. […] Persecution is a price worth paying for the Lord". Police are said to have told one member that the church had been declared an illegal organisation. Chinese media were banned from reporting the events. Video footage which found its way onto western social media showed arrests and photographs alleged to be of injuries inflicted by the police. Jiang's detention warrant it appears that the authorities have charged the church's leaders with "inciting subversion of state power", which carries a maximum sentence of 15 years.

Theater

The saying "Shu opera towers above all other performances in the world" reflects the achievement of Sichuan opera and Zaju (an ancient form of comedic drama involving dancing, singing, poetry, and miming). In the city, the first named opera "Bullfighting" was written in the Warring States Period. The first detailed recorded opera was staged in the royal court of Shu Kingdom during the Three Kingdom Period. China's first clearly recorded Zaju was also performed in Chengdu. Tombs of witty Han dynasty poets were excavated in Chengdu. And face-changing masks and fire breathing remain hallmarks of the Sichuan opera.

Language
The native language in Chengdu is Sichuanese, otherwise referred as Sichuan dialect. More precisely, "Chengdu Dialect" is widely used in lieu of "Sichuanese" due to the largely different accents of Sichuanese speakers residing elsewhere.

Culinary art and tea culture

The distinct characteristic of Sichuan cuisine is the use of spicy chilies and peppercorns. Famous local dishes include Mapo doufu, Chengdu Hot pot, and Dan Dan Mien. Both Mapo Doufu and Dan Dan Mien contain Sichuan peppers. An article by the Los Angeles Times (2006) called Chengdu "China's party city" for its carefree lifestyle. Chengdu has more tea houses and bars than Shanghai despite having less than half the population. Chengdu's tea culture dates back over a thousand years, including its time as the starting point of the Southern Silk Road.

Common side dishes popular in Chengdu include noodles, wontons, dumplings, pastries, tangyuan (sweet rice balls), drinks, salads and soups.

Chengdu is an officially recognised UNESCO City of Gastronomy.

Teahouse
Tea houses are ubiquitous in the city and range from ornate traditional establishments with bamboo furniture to simple modern tea houses. Teas on offer include jasmine, longjing and biluochun tea. Tea houses are popular venues for playing mahjong, getting a massage or one's ears clean. Some larger tea houses offer live entertainment such as Sichuan opera performances.

Hot pot
Hot pot is a traditional Sichuanese dish, made by cooking vegetables, fish, and/or meat in boiling spicy broth. A type of food suitable for friends' gathering, hot pot attracts both local people and tourists. Hot pot restaurants can be found everywhere in Chengdu.

Mahjong

Mahjong has been an essential part of most local peoples' lives. After daytime work, people gather at home or in the tea houses on the street to play Mahjong. On sunny days, local people like to play Mahjong on the sidewalks to enjoy the sunshine and also the time with friends. Almost everyone plays Mahjong with money.

Mahjong is the most popular entertainment choice among locals for several reasons. Chengdu locals have simplified the rules and made it easier to play as compared to Cantonese Mahjong. Also, Mahjong in Chengdu is a way to meet old friends and to strengthen family relationships. In fact, many business people negotiate deals while playing Mahjong. Furthermore, the elderly like to play Mahjong because they believe Mahjong makes them think and prevents dementia.

Rural tourism: Nong Jia Le
Chengdu claims to have first practiced the modern business model of 'Nong Jia Le' (Happy Rural Homes). It refers to the practice of suburban and rural residents converting their houses into restaurants, hotels and entertainment spaces in order to attract city dwellers.

Nong Jia Le features different styles and price levels and have been thriving around Chengdu. They provide gateways for city dwellers to escape the city, offer delicious and affordable home-made dishes, and provide mahjong facilities.

Some of the most popular ones are located in Sansheng Village east of Chengdu, and Nongke Village in Pidu District, northwest of Chengdu.

Customs and festivals

Grand Temple Fair
Chengdu's annual Grand Temple Fair is held every year during the Spring Festival (Chinese New Year) in Wuhou Shrine, Jinli, the Culture Park, and several other city parks. The 15-day-long festival showcases both traditional Sichuan folk art and modern fashions of the city. Food stalls on site offer over 100 varieties of freshly made local snacks.

Lantern Festival
Chengdu's annual Lantern Festival is held every year during the Spring Festival in Tazishan Park in the eastern part of Chengdu. Lanterns of different designs and themes are on display with traditional art performances including Sichuan opera, acrobatics shows, and local talk shows.

Dujiangyan Water Releasing Festival
Residents dress up in ancient costumes and read elegies for Li Bing and his sons, in order to honor them for their contribution to the irrigation project they built over 2,000 years ago.

Huanglongxi Fire Dragon Festival
Fire Dragon Festival of HuangLongXi is celebrated from the 2nd to the 15th day of the first lunar month of each new year.

The festival originated from South Song dynasty (1127–1279 AD). Celebrations include lighting paper dragons, a lion dance, floating lanterns on the water, and various street activities.

South China Snow and Ice Festival
The festival is popular among locals, especially children, since it rarely snows in Chengdu and people relish the sight of snow. A large variety of snow activities are offered during the festival.

Home of the giant panda

The giant panda, a Chinese national treasure, is one of the most popular animals in the world. The total number is estimated to be 1,500, including those living in the wild, 80 percent of which are in Sichuan Province.

A breeding center for giant pandas called Chengdu Research Base of Giant Panda Breeding was founded in the north suburbs of Chengdu. It is the only one of its kind in the world that's located in a metropolitan area. In order to better protect wild giant pandas, Chengdu has established nature reserves in Dujiangyan City, Chongzhou City, and Dayi County. Sichuan Wolong Giant Panda Nature Reserve, the biggest of its kind in the world, is only  outside Chengdu. After the Wenchuan earthquake, most of it was moved to Ya'an.

Aiming for the conservation of national wildlife, Chengdu Research Base of Giant Panda Breeding has developed a Chengdu Field Research Center for Giant Pandas of CRBGPB-"Panda Valley". This center creates a natural habitat, possessing up to 700 species of animals and plants for the pandas and provides them a natural environment without human disturbance.

The western world learned of giant pandas only after a French missionary named David first encountered this species in Sichuan in 1869. Now, the somewhat clumsy giant panda is a symbol representing the World Wildlife Fund. They are also a messenger of friendly communication between Chengdu and international cities. Currently, giant pandas are also reared in U.S.A, Germany, Austria, Belgium, Canada, Japan, Thailand as well as Mexico.

Chengdu has established the world-renowned breeding and research base for giant pandas, which attracts almost 100,000 visitors annually. Covering tens of hectares with bamboo groves and a native-like habitat, the base is the only one of its kind located in an urban area. A museum is open to the public throughout the year.

On 11 January 2012, six captive-bred pandas were released to a "semi-wild" environment in Dujiangyan, Chengdu.

Main sights

World natural and cultural heritage sites

Mount Qingcheng
Mount Qingcheng is amongst the most important Taoism sites in China.

Mount Qingcheng's Fujian Temple, Tianshi Cave, and Shizu Hall are some of the existing more well-known Taoist holy sites. Shangqing Temple is noted for an evening phosphorescent glow locally referred to as "holy lights".

Dujiangyan Irrigation System
The Dujiangyan Irrigation System ( away from Chengdu proper) is the oldest existing irrigation project in the world with a history of over 2000 years diverting water without a dam to distribute water and filter sand with an inflow-quantity control. The system was built by Libing and his son. The irrigation system prevents floods and droughts throughout the Plain of Chengdu.

Sichuan Giant Panda Sanctuaries

It is the largest remaining continuous habitat for giant pandas and home to more than 80 percent of the world's wild giant pandas. Globally speaking, it is also the most abundant temperate zone of greenery.

The Sichuan Giant Panda Sanctuaries are the most well-known of their kind in the world, with Wolong Nature Reserve, generally considered as the "homeland of pandas". It is a core habitat with unique natural conditions, complicated landforms, and a temperate climate with diverse wildlife.

Culture of poetry and the Three Kingdoms

Wuhou Shrine

Wuhou Shrine (Temple of Marquis Wu) is perhaps the most influential museum of Three Kingdoms relics in China. It was built in the Western Jin period (265–316) in the honor of Zhuge Liang, the famous military and political strategist who was Prime Minister of the Shu Han State during the Three Kingdoms period (220–280). The Shrine highlights the Zhuge Liang Memorial Temple and the Hall of Liu Bei (founder of the Shu Han state), along with statues of other historical figures of Shu Han, as well as cultural relics like stone inscriptions and tablets. The Huiling Mausoleum of Liu Bei represents a unique pattern of enshrining both the emperor and his subjects in the same temple, a rarity in China.

Du Fu thatched cottage

Du Fu was one of the most noted Tang dynasty poets; during the Lushan-Shi Siming Rebellion, he left Xi'an (then Chang'an) to take refuge in Chengdu. With the help from his friends, the thatched cottage was built along the Huanhua Stream in the west suburbs of Chengdu, where Du Fu spent four years of his life and produced more than 240 now-famous poems. During the Song dynasty, people started to construct gardens and halls on the site of his thatched cottage to honor his life and memory. Currently, a series of memorial buildings representing Du Fu's humble life stand on the river bank, along with a large collection of relics and various editions of his poems.

Ancient Shu civilization

Jinsha Site

The Jinsha Site are the first significant archeological discovery in China of the 21st century and were selected in 2006 as a "key conservation unit" of the nation. As a theme-park-style museum, it is for the protection, research, and display of Jinsha archaeological relics and findings.

Golden Sun Bird

The Golden Sun Bird was excavated by archaeologists from the Jinsha Ruins on 25 February 2001. In 2005, it was designated as the official logo of Chinese cultural heritage by the China National Relic Bureau.

The round, foil plaque dates back to the ancient Shu area in 210 BC and is 94.2 percent pure gold and extremely thin. It contains four birds flying around the perimeter, representing the four seasons and directions. The sun-shaped cutout in the center contains 12 sunlight beams, representing the 12 months of a year. The exquisite design is remarkable for a 2,200-year-old piece.

Sanxingdui Museum

The main collection highlights the Ancient City of Chengdu, Shu State & its culture, while displaying thousands of valuable relics including earthenware, jade wares, bone objects, gold wares, and bronzes that have been unearthed from Shang dynasty sacrificial sites.

Buddhist and Taoist culture

Daci Temple
The Daci Temple, a renowned temple in downtown Chengdu was first built during the Wei and Jin dynasties, with its cultural height during the Tang and Song dynasties. Xuanzang, an eminent Tang dynasty monk, was initiated into monkhood and studied for several years here; during this time, he gave frequent sermons in Daci Monastery.

Wenshu Monastery
Also named Xinxiang Monastery, Wenshu Monastery is the best preserved Buddhist temple in Chengdu. Initially built during the Tang dynasty, it has a history dating back 1,300 years. Parts of Xuanzang's skull are held in consecration here (as a relic). The traditional home of scholar Li Wenjing is on the outskirts of the complex.

Baoguang Monastery
Located in Xindu District, Baoguang (meaning divine light) Monastery enjoys a long history and a rich collection of relics. It is believed that it was constructed during the East Han period and has appeared in written records since the Tang dynasty. It was destroyed during the Ming dynasty in the early 16th century. In 1607, the ninth year of the reign of the Kangxi Emperor of the Qing dynasty, it was rebuilt.

Qingyang Taoist Temple
Located in the western part of Chengdu, Qingyang Temple ('Green/Black Goat Temple') is not only the largest and oldest Taoist temple in the city, but also the largest Taoist temple in Southwest China. The only existing copy of the Daozang Jiyao (a collection of classic Taoist scriptures) is preserved in the temple.

According to history, Qingyang Temple was the place where Lao Tzu preached his famous Dao De Jing to his disciple, Ying Xi.

Featured streets and historic towns

The Wide and Narrow Lanes
The Wide and Narrow Lanes (Kuan Xiangzi and Zhai Xiangzi, or Kuanzhai Alleys) were first built during the Qing dynasty for Manchu soldiers. The lanes remained residential until 2003 when the local government turned the area into a mixed-use strip of restaurants, teahouses, bars, avant-garde galleries, and residential houses.

Historic architecture has been well preserved in the Wide and Narrow lanes.

Jinli
Nearby Wuhou Shrine, Jinli is a popular commercial and dining area resembling the style of traditional architecture of western Sichuan. "Jinli" is the name of an old street in Chengdu dating from the Han dynasty and means "making perfection more perfect".

The ancient Jinli Street was one of the oldest and the most commercialized streets in the history of the Shu state and was well known throughout the country during the Qin, Han and Three Kingdoms periods.

Many aspects of the urban life of Chengdu are present in the current-day Jinli area: teahouses, restaurants, bars, theaters, handicraft stores, local snack vendors, and specialty shops.

Huanglongxi Historic Town
It was a large military stronghold for the ancient Shu Kingdom. The head of the Shu Han State in the Three Kingdoms period was seated in Huanglongxi, and for some time, the general government offices for Renshou, Pengshan, and Huayang counties were also located here.

The ancient town has preserved the Qing dynasty architectural style, as seen in the design of its streets, shops, and buildings.

Chunxi Road
Located in the center of downtown Chengdu, Chunxi Road is a trendy and bustling commercial strip with a long history. It was built in 1924 and was named after a part of the Tao Te Ching.

Today, it is one of the most well-known and popular fashion and shopping centers of Chengdu, lined with shopping malls, luxury brand stores, and boutique shops.

Anren Historic Town
It was the hometown of Liu Wencai, a Qing dynasty warlord, landowner and millionaire. His 27 historic mansions have been well preserved and turned into museums. Three old streets built during the Republic of China period are still being used today by residents. Museums in Anren have a rich collection of more of than 8 million pieces of relics and artifacts. A museum dedicated to the memorial of the 2008 Sichuan earthquake was built in 2010.

Luodai Historic Town
Luodai was built, like many historic structures in the area, during the period of the Three Kingdoms. According to legend, the Shu Han emperor Liu Shan dropped his jade belt into a well when he passed through this small town. Thus, the town was named 'lost belt'. It later evolved into its current name  with the same pronunciation, but a different first character.

Luodai Historic Town is one of the five major Hakka settlements in China. Three or four hundred years ago, a group of Hakka people moved to Luodai from coastal cities. It has since grown into the largest community for Hakka people.

Du Fu Thatched Cottage
Chinese name ,24 acre, at the western outskirts of Chengdu, adjacent to the Huanhua Xi (Flower Rinsing Creek). Key buildings in the Du Fu Cao Tang Park were constructed in the early 16th century during the Ming dynasty and extensively renovated in 1811 during the Qing dynasty.

Economy

China's state council has designated Chengdu as the country's western center of logistics, commerce, finance, science and technology, as well as a hub of transportation and communication. It is also an important base for manufacturing and agriculture.

According to the World Bank's 2007 survey report on global investment environments, Chengdu was declared "a benchmark city for investment environment in inland China".

Also based on a research report undertaken by the Nobel economics laureate, Dr. Robert Mundell and the celebrated Chinese economist, Li Yining, published by the State Information Center in 2010, Chengdu has become an "engine" of the Western Development Program, a benchmark city for investment environment in inland China, and a major leader in new urbanization.

In 2010, 12 of the Fortune 500 companies, including ANZ Bank, Nippon Steel Corporation, and Electricité de France, have opened offices, branches, or operation centers in Chengdu, the largest number in recent years. Meanwhile, the Fortune 500 companies that have opened offices in Chengdu, including JP Morgan Chase, Henkel, and GE, increased their investment and upgraded the involvement of their branches in Chengdu. By the end of 2010, over 200 Fortune 500 companies had set up branches in Chengdu, ranking it first in terms of the number of Fortune 500 companies in Central and Western China. Of these, 149 are foreign enterprises and 40 are domestic companies.

According to the 2010 AmCham China White Paper on the State of American Business in China, Chengdu has become a top investment destination in China.

The main industries in Chengdu—including machinery, automobile, medicine, food, and information technology—are supported by numerous large-scale enterprises. In addition, an increasing number of high-tech enterprises from outside Chengdu have also settled down there.

Chengdu is becoming one of the favorite cities for investment in Central and Western China. Among the world's 500 largest companies, 133 multinational enterprises have had subsidiaries or branch offices in Chengdu by October 2009. These MNEs include Intel, Cisco, Sony and Toyota that have assembly and manufacturing bases, as well as Motorola, Ericsson, and Microsoft that have R&D centers in Chengdu.
The National Development and Reform Commission has formally approved Chengdu's proposed establishment of a national bio-industry base there. The government of Chengdu has recently unveiled a plan to create a 90-billion-CNY bio pharmaceutical sector by 2012. China's aviation industries have begun construction of a high-tech industrial park in the city that will feature space and aviation technology. The local government plans to attract overseas and domestic companies for service outsourcing and become a well-known service outsourcing base in China and worldwide.

Electronics and IT industries
Chengdu has long been an established national electronics and IT industry hub. Chengdu's growth accelerated alongside the growth of China's domestic telecom services sector, which along with India's together account for over 70 percent of the world telecommunications market. Several key national electronics R&D institutes are located in Chengdu. Chengdu Hi-tech Industrial Development Zone has attracted a variety of multinationals, at least 30 Fortune 500 companies and 12,000 domestic companies, including Intel, IBM, Cisco, Nokia, Motorola, SAP, Siemens, Canon, HP, Xerox, Microsoft, Tieto, NIIT, MediaTek, and Wipro, as well as domestic powerhouses such as Lenovo. Dell plans to open its second major China operations center in 2011 in Chengdu as its center in Xiamen expands in 2010.

Intel Capital acquired a strategic stake in Primetel, Chengdu's first foreign technology company in 2001. Intel's Chengdu factory, set up in 2005 is its second in China, after its Shanghai factory, and the first such large-scale foreign investment in the electronics industry in interior mainland China. Intel, the world's largest chipmaker, has invested US$525 million in two assembly and testing facilities in Chengdu. Following the footsteps of Intel, Semiconductor Manufacturing International Corporation (SMIC), the world's third largest foundry, set up an assembly and testing plant in Chengdu. Intel's rival AMD is likewise set to open an R&D center in this city.

In November 2006, IBM signed an agreement with the Chengdu High-Tech Zone to establish a Global Delivery Center, its fourth in China after Dalian, Shanghai and Shenzhen, within the Chengdu Tianfu Software Park. Scheduled to be operational by February 2007, this new center will provide multilingual application development and maintenance services to clients globally in English, Japanese and Chinese, and to the IBM Global Procurement Center, recently located to the southern Chinese city of Shenzhen. On 23 March 2008, IBM announced at the "West China Excellent Enterprises CEO Forum" that the southwest working team of IBM Global Business Services is now formally stationed in Chengdu. On 28 May 2008, Zhou Weikun, president of IBM China disclosed that IBM Chengdu would increase its staff number from the present 600 to nearly 1,000 by the end of the year.

In July 2019, Amazon Web Services, the cloud computing company, signed a deal with the Cengdu High-Tech Zone to establish an innovation center. This project was intended to attract international business and enterprise into the area, promote cloud computing in China, and develop artificial intelligence technologies.

Over the past few years, Chengdu's economy has flourished rapidly. Chengdu is a major base for communication infrastructure, with one of China's nine top level postal centers and one of six national telecom exchanges hub.

In 2009, Chengdu hosted the World Cyber Games Grand Finals (11–15 November). It was the first time China hosted the world's largest computer and video game tournament.

Financial industry
Chengdu is a leading financial hub in the Asia-Pacific region and ranks 35th globally and 6th in China after (Shanghai, Hong Kong, Beijing, Shenzhen and Guangzhou) in the 2021 Global Financial Centres Index. Chengdu has attracted a large number of foreign financial institutions, including Citigroup, HSBC, Standard Chartered Bank, JPMorgan Chase, ANZ and MUFG Bank.

ANZ's data services center, established in 2011 in Chengdu, employs over 800 people, and in March 2019 the bank recruited further staff to support its data analytics and big data efforts. In 2020 ANZ temporarily repurposed its Chengdu data center to an IT helpdesk, as part of the bank's pandemic response.

In 1988, Dr. Joseph Fowler, a British professor of optoelectronics from Cambridge founded Scsi Capital, Asia's first venture capital firm focused on opportunities in the digital age, in Chengdu. Scsi currently manages an active portfolio in excess of CNY 300 billion and has operations in India, Israel, Singapore and USA. Scsi Capital is the world's largest private equity investor and fund of funds in the photovoltaic, compound semiconductor, multilayer cmos, ceramic packaging, display and advanced materials sector.

Historically, Chengdu has marked its name in the history of financial innovation. The world's first paper currency 'Jiao Zi' was seen in Chengdu in the year 1023, during the Song dynasty.

Now, Chengdu is not only the gateway of Western China for foreign financial institutions, but also a booming town for Chinese domestic financial firms. The Chinese monetary authority, People's Bank of China (China's central bank), set its southwest China headquarters in Chengdu City. In addition, almost all domestic banks and securities brokerage firms located their regional headquarters or branches in Chengdu. At the same time, the local financial firms of Chengdu are strengthening their presences nationally, notably, Huaxi Securities, Sinolink Securities and Bank of Chengdu. Moreover, on top of banks and brokerage firms, the flourish of local economy lured more and more financial service firms to the city to capitalise on the economic growth. Grant Thornton, KPMG, PWC and Ernst & Young are the four global accountants and business advisers with West China head offices in the city.

It is expected that by 2012, value-added financial services will make up 14 percent of the added-value service industry and 7 percent of the regional GDP. By 2015, those figures are expected to grow to 18 percent and 9 percent respectively.

Modern logistic industry
Because of its logistic infrastructure, professional network, and resources in science, technology, and communication, Chengdu has become home to 43 foreign-funded logistic enterprises, including UPS, TNT, DHL, and Maersk, as well as a number of well-known domestic logistic enterprises including COSCO, CSCL, SINOTRANS, CRE, Transfar Group, South Logistic Group, YCH, and STO. By 2012, the logistic industry in Chengdu will realize a value added of RMB 50 billion, with an average annual growth exceeding 18 percent. Ten new international direct flights will be in service; five railways for five-scheduled block container trains will be put into operation; and 50 large logistic enterprises are expected to have annual operation revenue exceeding RMB 100 million.

Modern business and trade
Chengdu is the largest trade center in western China with a market covering all of Sichuan province, exerting influence on a population of 250 million in six provinces, cities, and districts in western China. Chengdu ranks first among cities in western China in terms of the scale of foreign investment in commerce and trade. Out of the 40 World Top 250 retail enterprises based in China, 15 have opened branches in Chengdu. In downtown Chengdu, there are 71 department stores whose business area exceeds 10,000 sq. m, with the total business area reaching 2,600,000 sq. m. By 2012, total retail sales of consumer goods in Chengdu will exceed RMB 300 billion, up 18 percent annually on average; the total wholesales will exceed RMB 400 billion, with an annual increase of 25 percent. Total retail sales of the catering industry will exceed RMB 60 billion, up 20 percent annually; and the total exports and imports of Chengdu will be above US$35 billion, increasing 30 percent annually.

Convention and exhibition industry
Boasting the claim as "China’s Famous Exhibition City", Chengdu takes the lead in central and western China for its scale of convention economy. It has become one of the five largest convention and exhibition cities in China. In 2010, direct revenue from the convention and exhibition industry was RMB 3.2 billion, with a year-on-year growth of 26.9 percent. The growth reached a historical high.

More than 13.2 million people have come to Chengdu to participate in conventions and exhibitions from foreign countries and other parts of China. Numerous convention and exhibition companies have invested in Chengdu such as the UK-based Reed Exhibition, as well as domestic companies such as the Chinese European Art Center, Sanlian Exhibition, and Eastpo International Expo.

Software and service outsourcing industry
Chengdu is one of the first service outsourcing bases in China. More than 150,000 people in Chengdu are engaged in software-related work. Among the Top 10 service outsourcing enterprises in the world, Accenture, IBM, and Wipro are based in Chengdu. In addition, 20 international enterprises including Motorola, Ubi Soft Entertainment, and Agilent, have set up internal shared service centers or R&D centers in Chengdu. Maersk Global Document Processing Center and Logistic Processing Sub-center, DHL Chengdu Service Center, Financial Accounting Center for DHL China, and Siemens Global IT Operation Center will be put into operation. In 2010, offshore service outsourcing in Chengdu realized a registered contract value of US$336 million, 99 percent higher than the previous year.

New energy industry
Chengdu is the "National High-Tech Industry Base for New Energy Industry", as approved by the National Development and Reform Commission. Leading enterprises are operating in Chengdu and providing research and technology support such as Tianwei New Energy Holding Co., Ltd., Sichuan Sanzhou Special Steel Tube Co., Ltd., Zhejiang Tianma Bearing Co., Ltd., and key research institutions such as the Nuclear Power Institute of China, Southwestern Institute of Physics, Southwest Electric Power Design Institute.

In 2010, the new energy enterprises above realized 31.1 billion RMB in revenue from main operations, 43.2 percent more than the previous year. Chengdu ranked first again in the list of China's 15 "Cities with Highest Investment Value for New Energies" released at the beginning of 2011, and Shuangliu County under its jurisdiction entered "2010 China's Top 100 Counties of New Energies". By 2012, Chengdu's new energy industry will realize an investment over 20 billion RMB and sales revenue of 50 billion RMB.

Electronics and information industry
Chengdu is home to the most competitive IT industry cluster in western China, an important integrated circuit industry base in China, and one of the five major national software industry bases.

Manufacturing chains are already formed in integrated circuits, optoelectronics displays, digital video & audio, optical communication products, and original-equipment products of electronic terminals, represented by such companies as IBM, Intel, Texas Instruments, Microsoft, Motorola, Nokia, Ericsson, Dell, Lenovo, Foxconn, Compal, Wistron, and others.

Automobile industry
Chengdu has built a comprehensive automobile industry system, and preliminarily formed a system integrated with trade, exhibitions, entertainment, R&D, and manufacturing of spare parts and whole vehicles (e.g., sedans, coaches, sport utility vehicles, trucks, special vehicles). There are whole vehicle makers, such as Dongfeng-PSA (Peugeot-Citroën), Volvo, FAW-Volkswagen, FAW-Toyota, Yema, and Sinotruk Wangpai, as well as nearly 200 core parts makers covering German, Japanese, and other lines of vehicles.

In 2011, Volvo announced that its first manufacturing base in China with an investment of RMB 5.4 billion was to be built in Chengdu. By 2015, the automobile production capacity of Chengdu's Comprehensive Function Zone of Automobile Industry is expected to reach 700,000 vehicles and 1.25 million in 2020.

Modern agriculture
Chengdu enjoys favorable agricultural conditions and rich natural resources. It is an important base for high-quality agricultural products. A national commercial grain and edible oil production base, the vegetable and food supply base as well as the key agricultural products processing center and the logistics distribution center of western China are located in Chengdu.

Defense industry
Chengdu is home to many defense companies such as the Chengdu Aircraft Company, which produces the recently declassified J-10 Vigorous Dragon combat aircraft as well as the JF-17 Thunder, in a joint collaborative effort with Pakistan Air Force. Chengdu Aircraft Company is also currently developing the J-20 Mighty Dragon stealth fighter. The company is one of the major manufacturers of Chinese Military aviation technology.

Investment
The Chengdu Statistics Bureau reports that the total investment in fixed assets in 2008 was 301.29 billion yuan (US$43.38 billion). Domestic investment was 180.52 billion yuan (US$26 billion), an increase of 23.5 percent from 2007. The total amount of foreign direct investment reached US$2.25 billion, an increase of 97.3 percent from 2007.

Industrial zones

Chengdu Hi-tech Comprehensive Free Trade Zone 
Chengdu Hi-tech Comprehensive Free Trade Zone was established with the approval of the State Council on 18 October 2010 and passed the national acceptance on 25 February 2011. It was officially operated in May 2011. Chengdu High-tech Comprehensive Free Trade Zone is integrated and expanded from the former Chengdu Export Processing Zone and Chengdu Bonded Logistics Center. it is located in the Chengdu West High-tech Industrial Development Zone, with an area of 4.68 square kilometers and divided into three areas A, B and C. The industries focus on notebook computer manufacturing, tablet computer manufacturing, wafer manufacturing and chip packaging testing, electronic components, precision machining, and biopharmaceutical industry. Chengdu Hi-Tech Comprehensive Free Trade Zone has attracted top 500 and multinational enterprises such as Intel, Foxconn, Texas Instruments, Dell, Morse and so on.

In 2020, the Chengdu Hi-Tech Comprehensive Free Trade Zone achieved a total import and export volume of 549.1 billion yuan (including Shuangliu Sub-zone), accounting for 68% of the province's total foreign trade import and export volume, ranking No.1 in the national comprehensive free trade zones for three consecutive years.

Chengdu Economic and Technological Development Zone

Chengdu Export Processing Zone

Chengdu Hi-Tech Industrial Development Zone

Chengdu National Cross-Strait Technology Industry Development Park 
This was established in 1992 as the Chengdu Taiwanese Investment Zone.

Real estate
In 1988, The Implementation Plan for a Gradual Housing System Reform in Cities and Towns marked the beginning of overall housing reform in urban areas of China. More than 20 real estate companies set up in Chengdu, which was the first step for Chengdu's real estate development. The comprehensive Funan River renovation project in the 1990s had been another step towards promoting Chengdu environmental development. In 1992, Singapore capitals brought into Chengdu helped constructing Jinxiu Garden, which was the first elite residential area. Its advertisement was "Driving Volkswagen, Living in Jinxiu Garden.". In 1992, the first real estate management service company set up in Chengdu.

Chengdu started the Five Main Roads & One Bridge project in 1997. Three of the roads supported the east part of the city, the other two led to the south. It established the foundation of the Eastern and Southern sub-centers of Chengdu. The two major sub-centers determined people's eastward and southward living trends. Large numbers of buildings appeared around the east and south of the 2nd Ring Road. The Shahe River renovation project together with Jin River project also set off a fashion for people living by the two rivers. It was said that the map of Chengdu should update every three months.

In 2000, dozens of commercial real estate projects also appeared. While promoting the real estate market, the Chinese government encouraged citizens to buy their own houses by providing considerable subsidies at a certain period. Houses were included in commodities.

Transport

Air

Chengdu Shuangliu International Airport is the busiest airport in Central and Western China and the nation's fourth-busiest airport in 2018, with a total passenger traffic of 53 million in 2018. Shuangliu Airport is one of the two core hubs for Air China, together with Beijing, as well as the main hub and headquarters for Sichuan Airlines. Chengdu Airlines, China Eastern Airlines, China Southern Airlines, Shenzhen Airlines, Lucky Air and Tibet Airlines also have bases at Shuangliu International Airport.

Chengdu airport is also a 144-hour visa-free transit airport for foreigners from many countries (Austria, Belgium, the Czech Republic, Denmark, Estonia, Finland, France, Germany, Greece, Hungary, Iceland, Italy, Latvia, Lithuania, Luxembourg, Malta, the Netherlands, Poland, Portugal, Slovakia, Slovenia, Spain, Sweden, Switzerland, Russia, the United Kingdom, Ireland, Cyprus, Bulgaria, Romania, Ukraine, Serbia, Croatia, Bosnia and Herzegovina, Republic of Montenegro, Macedonia, Albania, United States, Canada, Brazil, Mexico, Argentina, Chile, Australia, New Zealand, South Korea, Japan, Singapore, Brunei, the United Arab Emirates, Qatar).

The airport has two runways and is capable of landing the Airbus A-380, currently the largest passenger aircraft in operation. Chengdu is the fourth city in China with two commercial-use runways, after Beijing, Shanghai and Guangzhou. On 26 May 2009, Air China, Chengdu City Government and Sichuan Airport Group signed an agreement to improve the infrastructure of the airport and increase the number of direct international flights to and from Chengdu. The objective is to increase passenger traffic to more than 40 million by 2015, making Chengdu Shuangliu International Airport the fourth-largest international hub in China, after Beijing, Shanghai and Guangzhou, top 30 largest airports in the world. Chengdu Shuangliu Airport ranked the No.1 and No.2 busiest airport in China in 2020 and 2021, respectively.

A second international airport, the Chengdu Tianfu International Airport with two main terminals and three runways, opened in June 2021.

Railway
Chengdu is the primary railway hub city and rail administrative center in southwestern China. The China Railway Chengdu Group manages the railway system of Sichuan Province, Chongqing City, and Guizhou Province. Chengdu has four main freight railway stations. Among them, the Chengdu North Marshalling Station is one of the largest marshalling stations in Asia. Since April 2013, companies are able to ship goods three times a week (initially only once a week) to Europe on trains originating from Chengdu Qingbaijiang Station bound for Łódź, Poland. It is the first express cargo train linking China and Europe, taking 12 days to complete the full journey.

There are four major passenger stations servicing Chengdu: Chengdu railway station (commonly referred to as the "North Station"), Chengdu South railway station (ChengduNan Station), Chengdu East railway station (ChengduDong Station), and Chengdu West railway station (ChengduXi Station). Additionally, Chengdu Tianfu Station is under construction.

Chengdu is the terminus of Baoji–Chengdu railway, Chengdu–Chongqing railway, Chengdu–Kunming railway, Chengdu–Dazhou railway, Shanghai–Wuhan–Chengdu high-speed railway, Chengdu-Lanzhou railway, Xi'an-Chengdu high-speed railway, Chengdu-Guiyang high-speed railway, Chengdu-Kunming high-speed railway and Chengdu–Dujiangyan high-speed railway.

The Chengdu–Dujiangyan high-speed railway is a high-speed rail line connecting Chengdu with the satellite city of Dujiangyan and the Mountain Qingcheng World Heritage Site. The line was built in 18 months and entered operation on 12 May 2010.

Metropolitan expressways
Chengdu's transport network is well developed, and Chengdu serves as the starting point for many national highways, with major routes going from Sichuan–Shanxi, Sichuan–Tibet, and Sichuan–Yunnan.

Several major road projects have been constructed: a  tunnel from Shuangliu Taiping to Jianyang Sancha Lake; alteration of the National Expressway 321, from Jiangyang to Longquanyi. By the end of 2008, there are ten expressways, connecting downtown Chengdu to its suburbs. The expressways are Chenglin Expressway, extensions of Guanghua Avenue, Shawan Line, and an expressway from Chengdu to Heilongtan.

After it opens to the public, it will take only about half an hour to drive from central Chengdu to Jintang, half the time of the current journey.

It is also toll-free and a journey from downtown Chengdu to Heilongtan will only take half an hour.

The extension of Guanghua Avenue, going towards the west of the city. It make the journey time from Chongzhou City to Sanhuan Road to less than half an hour.

After it is connected to the expressways Pixian–Dujiangyan and Pixian–Pengzhou, it will take only 30 minutes to go from Chengdu to Pengzhou.

Coach
There are many major intercity bus stations in Chengdu, and they serve different destinations.

 Chadianzi: Hongyuan, Jiuzhaigou, Rilong Town, Ruo Ergai, Songpan County, Wolong and Langzhong
 Xinnanmen (: Daocheng, Emei Shan, Jiǔzhàigōu, Kangding, Garzê Tibetan Autonomous Prefecture, Ya'an and Leshan
 Wuguiqiao: Chongqing
 Jinsha: Qionglai, Pi County and Huayang Chengdu East railway Station

Highways
National Highway G5 Beijing-Kunming
National Highway G42 Shanghai-Chengdu
National Highway G76 Xiamen-Chengdu
National Highway G93 Chengdu-Chongqing Region Circle
National Highway G4201 Chengdu 1st Circle
National Highway G4202 Chengdu 2nd Circle

Chengdu Metro

The Chengdu Metro officially opened on 1 October 2010. Line 1 runs from Shengxian Lake to Guangdu (south-north). Line 2 opened in September 2012. Line 3 opened in July 2016. Line 4 opened in December 2015. Line 10 connects to city center and Shuangliu International Airport. Future plans call for more than thirty lines. As of the end of June 2021, Chengdu has 518.96 km of metro lines in operation.

Bus

Bus transit is an important method of public transit in Chengdu. There are more than 400 bus lines in Chengdu with nearly 12,000 buses in total. In addition, the Chengdu BRT offers services on the Second Ring Road Elevated Road. Bus cards are available that permit free bus transfers for three hours.

River transport
Historically, the Jin River was used for boat traffic in and out of Chengdu. However, due to the size of the river itself and the reduced water depth over time, the Brocade River is no longer capable of carrying any type of water traffic. Therefore, Chengdu has no direct access to the Yangtze River or any other larger river. However, to ensure that Chengdu's goods have access to the river efficiently, inland port cities of Yibin and Luzhou—both of which are reachable from Chengdu within hours by expressways—on the Yangtze have commenced large-scale port infrastructure development. As materials and equipment for the rebuilding of northern Sichuan are sent in from the East Coast to Sichuan, these ports will see significant increases in throughput.

Education and research 
Wen Weng, administer of Chengdu in the Han dynasty, established the first local public school now named Shishi (literally a stone house) in the world. The school site has not changed for more than 2,000 years, which remains the site of today's Shishi High School. No. 7 High School and Shude High School are also two famous local public schools in Chengdu.

Chengdu is a leading scientific research city, one of the only two cities in the Western China region (alongside Xi'an), ranking in the top 30 cities worldwide by scientific research outputs. It is consistently ranked # 1 as the center of higher education and scientific research in Southwest China.

Colleges and Universities 

 Sichuan University (SCU) (Founded in 1896), including the West China Medical Center of Sichuan University (Founded in 1910)
 Southwest Jiaotong University (Founded in 1896)
 Southwestern University of Finance and Economics (Founded in 1925)
 University of Electronic Science and Technology of China (Founded in 1956)
Chengdu University of Technology (Founded in 1956)
 Sichuan Normal University (Founded in 1946)
 Chengdu University of Traditional Chinese Medicine (Founded in 1956)
 Chengdu Kinesiology University (Founded in 1942)
Southwest University for Nationalities (Founded in 1951)
 Sichuan Conservatory of Music (Founded in 1939)
Xihua University (Founded in 1960)
 Southwest Petroleum University (Founded in 1958)
Chengdu University of Information Technology (Founded in 1951)
 Chengdu University (Founded in 1978)
 Chengdu Medical College (Founded in 1947)
Note: Private institutions or institutions without full-time bachelor programs are not listed.

International schools
 Chengdu Meishi International School
 Chengdu International School
 Eton House
 The Léman International School – Chengdu
 Malvern College Chengdu
 Oxford International College of Chengdu
 Quality Schools International: QSI International School of Chengdu
 Confucius International School Chengdu CISCD: Anren Town Chengdu

Notable secondary schools
 Chengdu No.7 High School (Founded in 1902)
 Chengdu Shishi High School (Founded in 143 BC)
 Chengdu Shude High School (Founded in 1929)
 The Affiliated High School of Sichuan University
 The Affiliated High School of Sichuan Normal University
 Chengdu Experimental Foreign Languages School
 Chengdu Foreign Languages School

Consulates
The United States Consulate General at Chengdu opened on 16 October 1985. It was the first foreign consulate in west-central China since 1949. The United States Consulate General at Chengdu was closed on 27 July 2020, corresponding to the closure of Chinese Consulate-General, Houston. The Sri Lankan consulate in Chengdu opened in 2009, and was temporarily closed in 2016. Currently, sixteen countries have consulates in Chengdu. The Philippines, India, Greece, Turkey, Brazil and Argentina have been approved to open consulates in Chengdu.

Sports

Soccer 

Soccer is a popular sport in Chengdu. Chengdu Tiancheng, Chengdu's soccer team, played in the 42,000-seat Chengdu Sports Stadium in the Chinese League One. The club was founded on 26 February 1996 and was formerly known as Chengdu Five Bulls named after their first sponsor, the Five Bulls Cigarette Company. English professional soccer club Sheffield United F.C., took over the club on 11 December 2005. The club was later promoted into the China Super League until they were embroiled in a match-fixing scandal in 2009. Punished with relegation the owners eventually sold their majority on 9 December 2010 to Hung Fu Enterprise Co., Ltd and Scarborough Development (China) Co., Ltd. On 23 May 2013 the Tiancheng Investment Group announced the acquisition of the club.

Currently, Chengdu Rongcheng F.C. plays in the Chinese Super League. In addition, Sichuan Jiuniu F.C. plays in the China League One.

Longquanyi Stadium was one of the four venues which hosted the 2004 AFC Asian Cup. Chengdu, along with Shanghai, Hangzhou, Tianjin and Wuhan, hosted the 2007 FIFA Women's World Cup.

Tennis
Chengdu is the hometown of Grand Slam champions Zheng Jie and Yan Zi, who won the women's double championships at both the Australian Open and Wimbledon in 2006, and Li Na who won the 2011 French Open and 2014 Australian Open, has led to increased interest in tennis in Chengdu. Over 700 standard tennis courts have been built in the city in the past 10 years (2006–2016), and the registered membership for the Chengdu Tennis Association have grown to over 10,000 from the original 2,000 in the 1980s.

Thanks to the boom the country has now 30,000 tennis courts and an estimated 14 million people in China regularly playing tennis, up from 1 million when the sport returned to the Olympics in 1988, according to the WTA Tour. The Chinese government is aiming to increase that by 15 percent every year. The nation's tennis market has reached $4 billion annually, according to Tom Cannon, a professor and sports finance expert at the University of Liverpool Management School in England.

The women's tour upgraded the China Open in Beijing to become the only combined event with the men's tour in Asia. Played at the Beijing Olympic Tennis Center with combined prize money of $6.6 million and a main stadium that holds 10,000 spectators, the China Open is now one of the WTA's top four tournaments. The ATP's other flagship tournament in Asia is the $8.1 million Shanghai Masters.

Chengdu is now part of an elite group of cities to host an ATP (Association of Tennis Professionals) Champions Tour tournament, along with London, Zürich, São Paulo and Delray Beach. Chengdu Open, an ATP Championships Tour starting in 2009, have successfully invited star players including Pete Sampras, Marat Safin, Carlos Moya, Tomas Enqvist, and Mark Philippoussis.

Overwatch
Chengdu is represented in the Overwatch League by the Chengdu Hunters, the first major esports team to represent Chengdu. They play as part of the League's Pacific Division.

Multi-sport events
Chengdu will host the 2021 Summer Universiade, it would take place from 8–19 August 2021, but the delayed Summer Olympics in Tokyo from 2020 to 2021 will move proposed dates if these events are safe to organise with COVID-19 pandemic efforts. The city will also host the 2025 World Games.

Major sports venues

The Chengdu Sports Center is located in downtown Chengdu, covering  and has 42,000 seats. As one of the landmarks of Chengdu, it is the first large multipurpose venue in Chengdu that can accommodate sports competitions, trainings, social activities, and performances. It is the home stadium of the Chengdu Blades, Chengdu's soccer team. The stadium hosted the 2007 FIFA Women's World Cup.

It is the largest tennis center in southwest China and the fourth tennis center in China meeting ATP competition standards, after Beijing, Shanghai and Nanjing. This center is equipped with 36 standard tennis courts and 11,000 seats. Since 2016, the Chengdu Open, an ATP Championship Tour tournament, is held here annually.

The Chengdu Goldenport Circuit is a motorsport racetrack that has hosted the A1 Grand Prix, Formula V6 Asia, China Formula 4 Championship and China GT Championship.

International relations

Chengdu is twinned with:
  Agra, Uttar Pradesh, India
 Bengaluru, Karnataka, India
 Bonn, North Rhine-Westphalia, Germany (10 September 2009)
 Cebu City, Central Visayas, Philippines
 Chiang Mai, Chiang Mai Province, Thailand
 Daegu, South Korea (10 November 2015)
 Fingal, Ireland
 Flemish Brabant, Flanders, Belgium (27 May 2011)
 Gimcheon, North Gyeongsang Province, South Korea
 Haifa, Israel
 Hamilton, New Zealand (6 May 2015) 
 Honolulu, Hawaii, United States (14 September 2011)
 Horsens, East Jutland, Denmark
 Maputo, Mozambique
 Kandy, Central Province, Sri Lanka
 Kathmandu, Nepal
 Knoxville, Tennessee, United States
 Kofu, Yamanashi, Japan (27 September 1984)
 Lahore, Punjab, Pakistan
  Linz, Upper Austria, Austria (1983)
 Ljubljana, Slovenia (1981)
 Łódź, Łódź Voivodeship, Poland (29 June 2015)
 Lviv, Lviv Oblast, Ukraine (2014)
 Maastricht, Limburg, Netherlands (13 September 2012)
 Mechelen, Belgium (1993)
 Medan, North Sumatra, Indonesia (2002)
 Montpellier, Languedoc-Roussillon, France (22 June 1981)
 Nashville, Tennessee, United States
 Palermo, Sicily, Italy
 Perth, Western Australia, Australia (September 2012)
 Phoenix, Arizona, United States
 Sheffield, South Yorkshire, United Kingdom (23 March 2010)
 Volgograd, Volgograd Oblast, Russia (27 May 2011)
 Winnipeg, Manitoba, Canada (1988)
 Zapopan, Jalisco, Mexico

Chengdu also has friendly relationships or partnerships with:

 Adelaide, South Australia, Australia
 Atlanta, Georgia, United States
 Baku, Azerbaijan 
 Beyoğlu, Istanbul, Turkey
 City of Gold Coast, Queensland, Australia
 Dalarna, Sweden
 Fez, Morocco
 Milan, Lombardy, Italy
 Saint Petersburg, Russia
 Tallinn, Estonia
 Valencia, Spain

Notable people

Yang Hongying, (born 1962), best-selling author of children's fiction books
Tao Jiali (born 1987), fighter pilot in the People's Liberation Army Air Force
Shen Xiaoting (Born 1999), singer (Kep1er)

See also

 List of cities in China by population
 List of current and former capitals of subdivisions of China
 List of twin towns and sister cities in China

Explanatory notes

References

Citations

Bibliography
 Cheung, Raymond. OSPREY AIRCRAFT OF THE ACES 126: Aces of the Republic of China Air Force. Oxford: Bloomsbury Publishing Plc, 2015. .
 Mayhew, Bradley; Miller, Korina; English, Alex, South-West China, Lonely Planet Publications, 1998 (2nd edition 2002). Cf. p. 444 for its article on Chengdu.
 Quian, Jack, Chengdu: A City of Paradise, 2006

Further reading
 Ling Zhu, "Chengdu, the city of spice and tea" , China Daily, Government of China, Friday, 22 December 2006
 Anna Zhang, "City Profile: Chengdu – Land of Abundance", Shanghai Business Review, July 2012.

External links

 Official website of the Chengdu Government
 Official website of the Chengdu Government 
 

 
310s BC establishments
316 BC
National Forest Cities in China
Populated places established in the 4th century BC
Provincial capitals in China
Webarchive template wayback links
Eutrophication
Prefecture-level divisions of Sichuan
Cities in Sichuan
Sub-provincial cities in the People's Republic of China